The Royal Audiencia of Chile were two Spanish, colonial courts of appeals with administrative and political authority under the oversight of the viceroy of Peru.  

 Royal Audiencia of Concepción, installed in 1565 and abolished in 1575
 Royal Audiencia of Santiago, installed in 1609